Grantley is a village (also known as High Grantley) and civil parish in North Yorkshire, England. The parish also includes the hamlet of Low Grantley. The population of the parish was estimated at 130 in 2013.

The parish lies on the north bank of the River Skell, in a well-wooded valley. Grantley Sawmills is a local employer, just outside the parish on the south bank of the river.  Grantley Hall, on the north bank of the river, is an 18th-century Grade II* listed building, built by Thomas Norton and his son Fletcher Norton, 1st Baron Grantley.

The toponym, first mentioned in about 1030, is Old English, and means "clearing of a man called Grante".

Grantley was historically a township in the parish of Ripon in the West Riding of Yorkshire.  It became a separate civil parish in 1866, and was transferred to the new county of North Yorkshire in 1974.  The parish now shares a grouped parish council with Sawley.

References

External links 

Villages in North Yorkshire
Civil parishes in North Yorkshire